Nicolas Racot de Grandval (1676 – 16 November 1753) was a French composer, harpsichordist and playwright. He was born and died in Paris and was also named „Le Père Grandval“.

Although a respectable musician, at one time organist at St Eustache, his interests ran more to comedy, both in written comic dramas, such as the "Broken bed pot" and in musical comedy such as frivolous parodies on Clérambault's cantatas. His sister Marie-Hortense married the actor Charles Botot Dangeville.

Works 
Theatre
1693: La Baguette, comedy in 1 act and in prose, Théâtre-Français, 4 April
1697: Le Bourget, comedy in 1 act and in prose, Théâtre-Français, 23 May
1701: Les Trois Gascons, comedy in 1 act and in prose, Théâtre-Français, 4 June
1702: Le Bal d'Auteuil, comedy in 3 acts and in prose, Théâtre-Français,  22 August
1704: Le Port de mer, comedy in 1 act and in prose, Théâtre-Français, 27 May
1707: Le Diable boiteux, comedy in 1 act and in prose, Théâtre-Français, 8 October
1709: La Foire Saint-Laurent, comedy in 1 act and in verse, Théâtre-Français, 20 September
1713: L'Usurier gentilhomme, comedy in 1 act and in prose, Théâtre-Français, 11 September
1717: Le Prix de l'arquebuse, comedy in 1 act and in prose, Théâtre-Français, 1 October
1722: Le Camp de Porché-Fontaine, comedy in 1 act and in prose, Théâtre-Français, 9 October
1729: Les Réjouissances publiques, ou le Gratis, comedy in 1 act and in prose, Théâtre-Français, 18 September
1730: Le Divorce, ou les Époux mécontents, comedy in 3 acts and in verse with prologue, Théâtre-Français, 29 April 
1731: Le Mari curieux, comedy in 1 act and in prose, Théâtre-Français, 17 July
1735: Les Acteurs déplacés, comedy in 1 act and in prose with prologue, Théâtre-Français, 14 October
1738: Le Consentement forcé, comedy in 1 act and in prose, Théâtre-Français, 13 August
1739: Ésope au Parnasse, comedy in 1 act and in verse, Théâtre-Français, 14 October
1742: Amour pour amour, comedy in 3 acts and in verse with prologue, Théâtre-Français, 16 February 
1742: La Fête d'Auteuil, ou la Fausse méprise, comedy in 3 acts and in free verse, Théâtre-Français, 23 August
1743: Zénéïde, comedy in 1 act and in verse, Théâtre-Français, 13 May
1744: L'Algérien, ou les Muses comédiennes, comédie-ballet in 3 acts and in verse with prologue, Théâtre-Français, 15 September
1744: Le Quartier d'hiver, comedy in 1 act and in verse, Théâtre-Français, 4 December
1745:L'Étranger, comedy in 1 act and in verse, Théâtre-Français, 9 August
1745:Les Souhaits pour le roi, comedy in 1 act and in free verse, Théâtre-Français, 30 August
1747:Persiflès, tragedy in 4 acts and in vers, Versailles, Théâtre des Petits cabinets, 20 December 
1756:Agate, ou la Chaste princesse, tragedy
La Chauve-souris du sentiment, one-act comedy, s. d.
Le Pot de chambre cassé, tragédie pour rire ou comédie pour pleurer, dédiée à un habitant de l'autre monde, avec un discours préliminaire sur l'excellence des nouvelles découvertes en poésie, représentée pour la première fois à Ridiculomanie, capitale du grand royaume de Bavardise, à l'occasion du mariage du génie Pompon et de la fée Clinquantine, le 12 de la lune du verseau, remise au théâtre le 19 de la lune de l'écrevisse, l'an 30 depuis le renouvellement de l'ortographe, s. d. Attribuée aussi à Sulpice-Edme Gaubier de Barrault.
Varia
1732: Essai sur le bon goust en musique. Reprint: Genève et Paris, Minkoff, 1992.
1725: Le Vice puni, ou Cartouche, poem, with a slang-French lexicon [1723 par erreur de Barbier 1822 reprise in Quérard 1829], then a French-slang lexicon from some editions from 1725 or 1726 Text online of an unfaithful reprint of 1827  
1746: Almanach des proverbes augmenté pour 1746. Composé par Cartouchivandeck

Music
 Comic cantata Rien de tout - recorded by Patricia Petibon (Airs Baroques Français, 2002) and Dominique Visse (Cantates & Concertos Comiques 2010)

References

External links 
 Nicolas Racot de Grandval on Data.bnf.fr
 His plays on CÉSAR

French Baroque composers
French harpsichordists
17th-century French male actors
French male stage actors
17th-century French dramatists and playwrights
17th-century French male writers
18th-century French dramatists and playwrights
1676 births
1753 deaths
Musicians from Paris
Troupe of the Comédie-Française